For information on all United States Air Force Academy sports, see Air Force Falcons

The Air Force Falcons baseball team is a varsity intercollegiate athletic team of the United States Air Force Academy in Colorado Springs, Colorado, United States. The team is a member of the Mountain West Conference, which is part of the National Collegiate Athletic Association's Division I. Air Force's first baseball team was fielded in 1957. The team plays its home games at Falcon Baseball Field in Colorado Springs, Colorado. The Falcons are coached by Mike Kazlausky.

Major League Baseball
Air Force has had ten Major League Baseball Draft selections since the draft began in 1965.

Mountain West Tournament history
The Falcons have appeared in twelve Mountain West baseball tournaments since it began in 2000.

NCAA Tournament history
Air Force has been to the NCAA Division I baseball tournament  7 times in its history.

Head Coaches
In 65 years of play in college baseball, the Falcons have had fifteen head coaches.

See also
List of NCAA Division I baseball programs

References

External links
 

 
Baseball teams established in 1957
1957 establishments in Colorado